The 2015 All England Super Series Premier was the first super series tournament of the 2015 BWF Super Series. The tournament took place in Birmingham, England from 3 to 8 March 2015 and had a total purse of $500,000. A qualification draw occurred to fill four places in all five disciplines of the main draws.

Men's singles

Seeds

Top half

Bottom half

Finals

Women's singles

Seeds

Top half

Bottom half

Finals

Men's doubles

Seeds

Top half

Bottom half

Finals

Women's doubles

Seeds

Top half

Bottom half

Finals

Mixed doubles

Seeds

Top half

Bottom half

Finals

References 

All England Super Series
All England
Sports competitions in Birmingham, West Midlands
All England Open Badminton Championships
March 2015 sports events in the United Kingdom